Clinton Albert Cilley (February 16, 1837 – May 9, 1900) was a North Carolina lawyer and judge, and a recipient of the Medal of Honor for his actions as an officer in the Union Army at the Battle of Chickamauga in the American Civil War.

Biography
Cilley joined the 2nd Minnesota Infantry as a sergeant in June 1861, and was commissioned as a second lieutenant six months later. He mustered out in September 1866 with the rank of major and a brevet (honorary promotion) to the rank of colonel.

Cilley moved to western North Carolina at the end of the Civil War and became regional administrator for the Freedmens Bureau. Although he was essentially a carpetbagger, Cilley became very popular as a lawyer in Lenoir, North Carolina, where he was elected one of the town's first mayors. He married Emma Harper, daughter of Congressman James C. Harper.

In 1890 he joined the New Hampshire Society of the Sons of the American Revolution.  He was assigned national membership number 7521 and state society number 21.

He died May 9, 1900 and is buried in Oakwood Cemetery Hickory (Catawba County), North Carolina. His grave can be found in Section 2-E, Row 2.

Honors
The Catawba County Museum of History contains the Clinton Cilley Collection of Civil War artifacts.

Medal of Honor citation
Rank and organization: Captain, Company C, 2d Minnesota Infantry. Place and date: At Chickamauga, Ga., September 20, 1863. Entered service at: Wasioja, Minn. Birth: Rockingham County, N.H. Date of issue: June 12, 1895.

Citation:
Seized the colors of a retreating regiment and led it into the thick of the attack.

See also

List of Medal of Honor recipients
List of American Civil War Medal of Honor recipients: A–F

Notes

References
 

United States Army Medal of Honor recipients
Union Army colonels
North Carolina state court judges
1837 births
1900 deaths
Mayors of places in North Carolina
American Civil War recipients of the Medal of Honor
Sons of the American Revolution
People from Lenoir, North Carolina
19th-century American judges